

Events 
January 1 – Arnold von Bruck retires from his position as Kapellmeister at the Viennese court.
May - Cipriano de Rore appointed maestro do cappella at the court in Ferrara, a post he held until 1559.
Jacquet de Berchem appointed maestro di cappella at Verona Cathedral

Publications 
Giulio Abondante - , the first of three extant books of lute music published in Venice by Antonio Gardano
Paolo Aretino – Pie ac devotissime Lamentationes Hyeremie prophete tum etiam Passiones Hiesu Christi Dominice Palmarum ac Veneris Sancti (Venice: Angelo Gardano), a collection of litanies
Jacquet de Berchem – First book of madrigals for five voices (Venice: Antonio Gardano)
Simon Boyleau – Madrigals for four voices
Antoine de Mornable
, book 1, for four voices (Paris: Pierre Attaingnant)
17 Psalms for four voices (Paris: Pierre Attaingnant)
Alonso Mudarra - 'Three Books of Music for vihuela in tablature' (Seville: Juan de Leon)
Caspar Othmayr –  for five voices (Nuremberg: Johann vom Berg & Ulrich Neuber)
Girolamo Parabosco – Madrigali a cinque voci (Venice: Antonio Gardano)

Classical music 
Giovan Tomaso di Maio – Canzone villanesche a 3, book 1

Births 
date unknown – 
September 3 – Isabella Bendidio, Italian noblewoman and singer (died 1610)
October 5 – Cyriakus Schneegass, German hymnwriter (d. 1597)
date unknown 
 Luca Bati, Italian composer (died 1608)
 Joachim a Burck, German hymn writer, composer, organist and Kantor (died 1610)

Deaths 
 Fridolin Sicher (56), organist and composer

References

 
Music
16th century in music
Music by year